Denis Grondin (born 23 October 1954) is a Canadian Roman Catholic prelate.

Born in Rimouski, Quebec, Grondin was ordained to the priesthood in 1989. He served as an auxiliary bishop of the Quebec archdiocese from 2011 until 2015, when he was appointed archbishop of his hometown Rimouski.

References

1954 births
Living people
Canadian Roman Catholic bishops
French Quebecers
Clergy from Quebec
People from Rimouski
21st-century Roman Catholic archbishops
Université Laval alumni